Mohamed Salah (born 1992) is an Egyptian professional footballer who plays as a forward for English club Liverpool and the Egypt national team.

Mohamed Salah may also refer to:

Sports
Mohamed Salah Jedidi (1938–2014), Tunisian professional footballer
Mohamed Salah (footballer, born 1956), Egyptian former professional footballer and head coach of Pharco FC
Mohamed Salah Abo Gresha (born 1970), Egyptian professional footballer, most notably for Ismaily SC
Mohamed Salah Elneel (born 1991), Qatari professional footballer
Mohamed Salah (Indian footballer) (born 1994), Indian professional footballer
Mo Salah (footballer, born 2004), Belgian professional footballer

Politics
Mohamed Salah Dembri (1938–2020), Algerian politician, former Minister of Foreign Affairs
Mohamed Salah Mzali (1896–1984), Tunisian politician, former Prime Minister of Tunisia
Mohamed Salah Zaray, Tunisian politician, Tunisian delegate to Pan-African Parliament
Mohamed Salah al-Din Zaidan, de facto leader/general emir of Al-Qaeda after the death of Ayman al-Zawahiri.

Others
Mohamed Salah Ben Mrad (1881–1979), Tunisian theologian, journalist and intellectual
Mohamed Salah El Azab (born 1981), Egyptian writer and novelist